Elbrus Avia was a passenger airline company based in Nalchik, Russia. The airline offered scheduled flights to Moscow. It was the only airline flying to Kabardino-Balkaria where Mount Elbrus, the highest  peak of Europe, is its namesake. Founded in 1998, the airline had its licence cancelled by the Federal Air Transport Agency on 15 April 2009.

Fleet
Yakovlev Yak-42D - 4 (Two stored at Bykovo (Moscow), stored at Nalchik and one operating for Volgograd Airlines)
Yakovlev Yak-40  - 3 (Stored)
Mil Mi-8 -3 (used on domestic and special charters)
Mil Mi-2 -3 (used on domestic and special charters)

Destinations
Russia
Moscow (Vnukovo International Airport)
Nalchik (Nalchik Airport) Hub
Azau  (Mount Elbrus)
Greece
 Thessaloniki (Makedonia International Airport)
Austria
Salzburg (W. A. Mozart Airport)
Turkey
 Istanbul (Atatürk International Airport)

Charter flights
Hungary
Budapest - Budapest Ferihegy International Airport
England
London - London Stansted Airport
France
Lyon - Lyon Saint Exupery Airport
Basel - Mulhouse Euro Airport
Malta
Valletta - Malta International Airport

References

External links

Elbrus-Avia
Some photos

Defunct airlines of Russia
Airlines established in 1998
Airlines disestablished in 2009
Companies based in Kabardino-Balkaria